Laura Elizabeth Campbell (born 24 May 1953), better known as Nell Campbell or by her stage name Little Nell, is an Australian actress, singer, and former club owner. She is best known for her role as Columbia in the 1975 film The Rocky Horror Picture Show, and the original stage play from which it was adapted. Campbell released her EP, The Musical World of Little Nell (Aquatic Teenage Sex & Squalor), through A&M Records in 1978. She appeared as Nurse Ansalong in the 1981 film Shock Treatment.

Early life
Campbell was born in Sydney, to Ruth and Ross Campbell. Ross, a writer, referred to her as "Little Nell" (after a character in Charles Dickens' The Old Curiosity Shop) in his family life column in the Sydney Daily Telegraph. She grew up with three siblings: Sally, Patrick, and Cressida. Elder sister Sally was a property master, a set designer, and (subsequently) a fashion designer; younger sister Cressida Campbell is an artist; elder brother Patrick (who died in 2020) was a solar engineer at the University of New South Wales. Nell began dancing when she was 10, in order to remain healthy following being diagnosed with hepatitis A. She was called Laura E. Campbell until the age of about 17, when she went by the nickname "Sonny" (pronounced to rhyme with "Donny"), short for "Sonata". She attended high school at Abbotsleigh School for Girls in Sydney, supporting herself as a waitress.

Career
Campbell decided to use the name "Little Nell" as a stage name after her arrival in Britain in the early 1970s with her family. She sold clothes at Kensington Market; her stall was next to Freddie Mercury's. She also worked as a busker and as a soda jerk in a café, where her tap dancing is often noted as the reason why she was cast as Columbia in the original production of The Rocky Horror Show following an impromptu audition. She reprised the role in The Rocky Horror Picture Show, released in 1975, and starred as Nurse Ansalong in the 1981 sequel, Shock Treatment.

After The Rocky Horror Picture Show, Campbell signed a recording contract with A&M Records. Her debut single was "Stilettos and Lipstick" backed with "Do the Swim", released in 1975. She also recorded a disco version of the song "Fever" in 1976, which was again backed with "Do the Swim". The B-side of both of these releases became better-known, perhaps helped by a performance on British television in which she accidentally (and repeatedly) exposed her breasts. While edited out of the original broadcast in 1975, the unedited version was shown worldwide on bloopers shows (beginning with the British show It'll be Alright on the Night in 1977). Following this notoriety, another effort was made to promote the recordings made in 1975 and 1976. In 1978, a "triple B-side" extended play titled The Musical World of Little Nell (Aquatic Teenage Sex & Squalor) was released which featured both "Do the Swim" and "Stillettos and Lipstick" along with the track "Dance that Cocktail Latin Way" (also known as "Tropical Isle") which originally appeared as the B-side of her second single from 1976. Following some success with the EP, the other two tracks, singles "Fever" and "See You Round like a Record", were released as a single but that was to be her last release on A&M. A final single, "Beauty Queen" from the film The Alternative Miss World, was released on PRE Records in 1980.

Campbell has also appeared in several stage productions, including the Off-Broadway play You Should Be So Lucky and the Broadway musical Nine. She appeared as Sandra LeMon in the British TV series Rock Follies of '77.

In 1986, Campbell opened the nightclub Nell's on West 14th Street in Manhattan (New York) with Keith McNally and Lynn Wagenknecht. In 1995 she opened two restaurants in New York: The Kiosk (uptown) and E&O (downtown). Nell's was sold in 1998 to Noel Ashman and his business partner, actor Chris Noth, right before Campbell gave birth to her daughter, Matilda Violet, with ex-boyfriend and business partner, Eamon Roche. The club closed in 2004.

Campbell has written several magazine articles, including regular segments called "MamaTalks" and "FirstLook" in the now defunct Talk magazine, starting in the December 1999 issue.

Filmography

Film

Television

Theatre

Discography 
Singles / EPs
 "Stillettos and Lipstick" / "Do the Swim" (A&M, 1975)
 "See You Round like a Record" / "Dance that Cocktail Latin Way" (A&M, 1976)
 "Fever" / "Do the Swim" (A&M, 1976)
 The Musical World of Little Nell (Aquatic Teenage Sex & Squalor) (A&M, 1978)
 "Fever" / "See You Round like a Record" (reissue) (A&M, 1978)
 "Beauty Queen" (Pre Records, 1980)

Guest vocals
 Tuff Little Surfer Boy (featured as "Roxanne" for the song by Truth & Beauty) (1974)

Soundtracks and Cast Recordings
 The Rocky Horror Show (Original London Cast) (1973)
 The Rocky Horror Picture Show (1975)
 Shock Treatment (1981)

References

External links 
 Website
 
 Little Nell at RockyMusic.org

1953 births
Australian women singers
Australian film actresses
Living people
Actresses from Sydney
People educated at Abbotsleigh